Mount Hosmer is a bluff overlooking Lansing, Iowa. It is located directly adjacent to the Upper Mississippi River and offers a panoramic view of the river, including the Black Hawk Bridge. Mount Hosmer rises 450 feet above downtown Lansing.

Accessible from Lansing, Mount Hosmer Park is a popular destination for photographers. According to a plaque inside the park, Mount Hosmer is named for Harriet Hosmer, a sculptor, who won a footrace to the summit of the hill during a steamboat layover during the 1850s.

Notes

See also
 Pikes Peak, a similar park atop a bluff in Clayton County

Landforms of Iowa
Cliffs of the United States
Landforms of Allamakee County, Iowa